Hoboken Hollow is a 2006 American horror film directed by Glen Stephens, and starring Jason Connery, Rudolf Martin, C. Thomas Howell, Dedee Pfeiffer, Greg Evigan, Randy Spelling, Matt Cedeño, Robert Carradine, Dennis Hopper, and Michael Madsen. It is loosely based on the real-life Texas Slave Ranch.

Plot 

As Trevor (Jason Connery) drifts through Texas he is still haunted by the evils of the war he recently returned from and a promise he failed to keep. When a stranger offers a ride, Trevor finds himself battling the brutal homegrown evil of the Broderick family at Hoboken Hollow, a remote West Texas ranch that many have visited but few ever leave.

Cast
 Jason Connery as Trevor Lloyd
 C. Thomas Howell as Clayton Connelly
 Mark Holton as Weldon Brodrick
 Lin Shaye as Mrs. Brodrick
 Randy Spelling as Parker Hilton
 Dennis Hopper as Sheriff Greer
 Michael Madsen as J.T. Goldman
 Robert Carradine as Thad Simmons
 Greg Evigan as Tom Stockwell
 Dedee Pfeiffer as Rhonda Simmons
 Jonathan Fraser as Junior Broderick

Release

Home media
The film was released on DVD by Slam Dunk on February 19, 2007; later that year on April 24, it was released by Triumph Marketing. On September 29, 2008, it was released by In2Film. It was re-released numerous times by Echo Bridge Entertainment, first as a single-feature on August 3, 2010; and later that year until 2013 as a part of several multi-feature film collections.

Reception

Hoboken Hollow received mostly negative reviews from critics upon its release, with many calling it "exploitive" of the events it was based on.
Joe Leydon from Variety panned the film, writing, "Hoboken Hollow may very well be, as its opening credits insist, based on real-life events. But that doesn't prevent this indifferently made and luridly gory exploitation pic from coming off like formulaic fiction of the most repulsive sort." Sean Badgley from The Austin Chronicle gave the film one out of five stars, criticizing the film's one-dimensional and unsympathetic characters, "empty and ineffective" violence, and lack of scares. Phil Davies Brown from Horror Asylum offered the film similar criticism, calling the film "one of the worst films of the year", panning the film's acting, soundtrack, and perceived racism.

Alternately, Geno McGahee from ScaredStiffReviews gave the film a positive review, writing, "Hoboken Hollow proves that you do not need a big budget to create a good film. There is a 1970’s feel to this film and it is paced very well, never letting up and building and building until the surprising conclusion."

References

External links
 
 
 
 

2006 horror films
2006 films
American independent films
Films set on farms
Films set in Texas
Films shot in Texas
2000s exploitation films
American splatter films
Crime films based on actual events
Horror films based on actual events
2006 independent films
2000s crime drama films
Backwoods slasher films
American slasher films
2006 drama films
2000s English-language films
2000s American films